The Sydney Telstra 500 was the fourteenth and final event of the 2010 V8 Supercar Championship Series and the second running of the Sydney 500. It was held on the weekend of the December 3 to 5 on the Homebush Street Circuit in Sydney Olympic Park, Sydney, New South Wales.

The Sydney Telstra 500 comprised the 25th and 26th races of the season. The race format followed the same as the Adelaide 500, with a 250 kilometre race each day.

Leading into the weekend, James Courtney of Dick Johnson Racing, reigning champion Jamie Whincup of Triple Eight Race Engineering and Mark Winterbottom of Ford Performance Racing were in contention to win the championship. With the trio running in the top three, a late-race downpour on the Saturday saw all three drivers, amongst many others, hit the wall at Turn 5. Dick Johnson Racing, unlike Triple Eight and Ford Performance Racing, crucially managed to get Courtney on track in time to score points. This gave Courtney the advantage heading into the Sunday race, in which his 14th-place finish was sufficient to secure his maiden championship.

Meanwhile, the Saturday race was won by Tekno Autosports' Jonathon Webb, who had only started 21st after a qualifying crash. Webb survived the chaos during the late-race rain to take his first race victory narrowly ahead of Jason Bright. Lee Holdsworth, who started both races on pole, won the Sunday race, after taking the lead from the low-on-fuel Shane van Gisbergen on the final lap. Steven Richards finished second, in his final full-time drive in the championship.

Support categories
 Australian Mini Challenge - the final event in the championship's history
 Fujitsu V8 Supercars Series
 Touring Car Masters
 V8 Utes

References

External links
 Official series website

Sydney 500
Motorsport in Sydney
December 2010 sports events in Australia